The New York State Executive Department of the New York state government serves as the administrative department of the Governor of New York. This department has no central operating structure; it consists of a number of divisions, offices, boards, commissions, councils, and other independent agencies that provide policy advice and assistance to the governor and conduct activities according to statute or executive order. Its regulations are compiled in title 9 of the New York Codes, Rules and Regulations.

History
At the time of the New York's 1920s constitutional reforms, the Executive Department—headed by the Governor—housed only a few core functions such as budgeting, procurement, the state police and military and naval affairs. Since that time, numerous agencies have been created within the Executive Department to accommodate governmental functions not anticipated in the 1920s, while conforming with the limits established by the Constitution. These additions include divisions and offices that do not logically fit into the framework of the other departments, such as the Division of Veterans' Affairs (which advises veterans on services, benefits and entitlements, and administers payments of bonuses and annuities to blind veterans) and the Office of General Services (which provides centralized data processing, construction, maintenance and design services as well as printing, transportation and communication systems).

List of divisions, etc.
Some of the  divisions, offices, boards, commissions, councils, and other independent agencies that are part of the New York State Executive Department are the:

 New York State Homes and Community Renewal (HCR)
 New York State Division of Housing and Community Renewal (DHCR)
 New York State Office of Rent Administration (ORA)
 New York State Affordable Housing Corporation (AHC)
 State of New York Mortgage Agency (SONYMA)
 New York State Housing Finance Agency (HFA)

 New York State Division of Veterans' Affairs
 New York State Division of Human Rights
 New York State Division of Alcoholic Beverage Control
New York Office of Cannabis Management
 New York State Board of Elections
 New York State Office of General Services
 New York State Office of Information Technology Services
 New York State Office of Parks, Recreation and Historic Preservation
 Adirondack Park Agency

Crime control
 New York State Police
 New York State Commission of Correction
 New York State Division of Criminal Justice Services
 New York State Division of Military and Naval Affairs
 New York State Gaming Commission
 New York State Office of Victim Services

References

External links
 Executive Department in the New York Codes, Rules and Regulations (NYCRR)
 State Division of Criminal Justice Services
 Subtitle U — Division of Criminal Justice Services in the NYCRR
 New York State Homes and Community Renewal
 Subtitle S — Division of Housing and Community Renewal in the NYCRR
 New York State Division of Veterans' Services

Executive
Executive Department